Micrommata virescens, common name green huntsman spider, is a species of huntsman spiders belonging to the family Sparassidae.

Distribution
This species has a Palearctic distribution. It occurs naturally in Northern and Central Europe, including Denmark and southern Britain.

Description

The cephalothorax and the long legs of the females are bright green, with a lighter green abdomen showing a darker green median stripe. The eight eyes are arranged in two rows and surrounded by white hairs. Males are dark green-olive and have a narrower abdomen, with red sides and a red to red-brown median stripe bordered yellow. Young spiders have a yellow-brown cephalothorax, with dark marginal and median stripes. Only after the last molting in the following spring the juveniles assume the typical coloration of the adults.

The green coloration is due to the bilin micromatabilin and its conjugates in haemolymph, interstitial tissues and the yolk of oocytes.

Habitat
These characteristic huntsman spiders can be found at the edges of forests, in dry meadows, in damp woodland clearings and rides, where they prefer grass and the lower branches of trees.

Biology
These spiders are mainly diurnal. Like many other spiders, they do not build a web, and hunt insects in green vegetation, where they rely on their camouflage. Their green color makes them very difficult to be detected by predators. They grow relatively slowly, taking 18 months to reach maturity. Females are fertile from May through to September. A few days after mating, the males die. In July the females enclose the egg-sac into a few leaves stitched together. Cocoons are guarded by females. After about 4 weeks eggs hatch about 40-50 young spiders.

References

Further reading
 A. Bayram & S. Özda (2002). Micrommata virescens (Clerck, 1757), a new species for the spider fauna of Turkey (Araneae, Sparassidae). Turkish Journal of Zool 26: 305–307 PDF

External links

Macro-Photographs and information on Micrommata virescens (German language)

Sparassidae
Spiders of Europe
Arthropods of Turkey
Spiders described in 1757
Taxa named by Carl Alexander Clerck
Palearctic spiders